The Battle of Whampoa was fought between British and Chinese forces at Whampoa Island (modern-day Pazhou Island) on the Pearl River near the city of Canton (Guangzhou), Guangdong, China, on 2March 1841 during the First Opium War.

Battle
On 2March 1841, Commodore James Bremer, commander-in-chief of British forces, sent Capt. Edward Belcher of the Sulphur to reconnoitre the Junk River. The ship was towed by three of the Wellesleys boats under Lt. Richard Symonds. As they approached the northeast end of Whampoa Island, a Chinese battery of about 25 guns, which were masked by thick tree branches, opened fire on the ships. Lt. Symonds immediately cut the tow line, the boats sailed towards the shore and the boat crews landed. The battery was defended by 250 Manchu Tartar troops. They fled for shelter in the neighbouring jungle, but were dislodged by artillery from the Sulphur. After the British captured the forts, the guns were destroyed and the works and magazines blown up.

Bremer reported 15 or 20 Tartars killed. One British seaman from the Wellesley died from wounds after being shot through the lungs with grapeshot. Bremer resigned the command of the land forces to Maj. Gen. Hugh Gough, who joined the fleet on board the Cruizer. Former Imperial Commissioner Lin Zexu wrote in his diary entry for 2March: "I hear that the English rebel ships have already forced their way to the fort at Lieh-te. Early in the morning I went to talk things over at the General Office in the Monastery of the Giant Buddha."

Notes
Footnotes

Citations

References

Bulletins of State Intelligence. Westminster: F. Watts. 1841.
Belcher, Edward (1843). Narrative of a Voyage Round the World. Volume 2. London: Henry Colburn.
Bingham, John Elliot (1842). Narrative of the Expedition to China, from the Commencement of the War to Its Termination in 1842 (2nd ed.). Volume 2. London: Henry Colburn.
Hall, William Hutcheon; Bernard, William Dallas (1846). The Nemesis in China (3rd ed.). London: Henry Colburn.
Ouchterlony, John (1844). The Chinese War. London: Saunders and Otley.
Waley, Arthur (1958). The Opium War Through Chinese Eyes. Stanford, California: Stanford University Press. .

1841 in China
Whampoa
Whampoa
History of Guangzhou
Whampoa
March 1841 events
Amphibious operations involving the United Kingdom
Events in Guangzhou